The Pitman's Revenge (against Bonaparte)   is a traditional Geordie folk song, written circa 1804, by George Cameron in the Geordie dialect. The song is about the threat of invasion posed by Napoleon Bonaparte.

History
Around this period, Napoleon had gathered his armies and was threatening Britain. All over the country volunteer regiments (a sort of Home Guard) were being recruited.
George Cameron served as a Sergeant in one such regiment formed to defend Newcastle upon Tyne. He wrote this, his first (and it appears his only) song "The Pitman's Revenge against Bonaparte" during this period, c1804. He first performed the song at a meeting of his regiment, and despite being met with much approval this appears to have been the only song he wrote. According to the 1872 edition of "Allan's Illustrated Edition of Tyneside songs", Cameron's daughter reported that the writer first performed the song at a meeting of his regiment at the Three Indian Kings on Newcastle's Quayside, and that the song was later borrowed by a friend, who, unbeknown to the writer, arranged for it to be published.

Variations to the lyrics 
In the early 19th century there were many cheap books and magazines. These books were on poor quality paper with poor quality print. The works were copied with no thought of copyright, very little proof-reading, and what was done was often not to a high standard. Consequently, the dialect words varied between editions. As this was a very popular song, it appeared in numerous editions. The many versions published show variations, mainly in the spelling of the words, and sometimes there were variations within the same edition.

In 1891 a report from Cameron's grandson showed that on the first printing by Bell, a whole line had been missed and in various other printings the author's name had either been omitted or erroneously given as John Shield. These errors were corrected in 1891, with the missing line being restored after 70 years.

Some specific differences between the original and copies are noted below.

Specific differences
Verse 1 Line 8 – originally this line was omitted in the printing
Verse 1 Line 9 – originally started with "For"
Verse 4 Line 8 – varies between wad nae heed and waddent heed
Verse 6 Line 7 – varies from "Aw'd tyek me pick, and hew them doon" or "aw'd hew"

Lyrics

The Pitman's Revenge (Against Bonaparte)

Verse 1	<br/ >

See also
Geordie dialect words

References

External links
Allan’s Illustrated Edition of Tyneside songs 1891
The Pitman's Revenge – from A collection of songs, comic, satirical and descriptive, chiefly in the Newcastle Dialect, Marshal, 1827
The Tyne Songster, a choice selection of Songs in the Newcastle Dialect. Fordyce  1840

English folk songs
Songs related to Newcastle upon Tyne
1800s songs
Northumbrian folklore